Świerznica is a river of Poland, a tributary of the Mogilica near Rąbino.

Rivers of Poland
Rivers of West Pomeranian Voivodeship